Talarico or Tallarico is a surname. Notable people with the surname include:

Gigia Talarico (born 1953), Bolivian writer
Guy Talarico (born 1955), American politician
Lita Talarico, American graphic designer
Picky Talarico, music video director
Rich Talarico (born 1973), American television writer and producer
Susette Talarico (1946–2007), American political scientist and legal scholar
Vincenzo Talarico (1909–1972), Italian screenwriter and actor
James Talarico (born 1982), American politician